Osteomodulin (also called osteoadherin or osteoadherin proteoglycan) is a protein that in humans is encoded by the OMD gene.

References

Further reading

Proteoglycans